South Junction is a community in southeastern Manitoba in the Rural Municipality of Piney. The Roseau–South Junction Border Crossing is located south of the community.

References 

Unincorporated communities in Eastman Region, Manitoba